Flag of London may refer to:

the flag of the City of London in the United Kingdom
the Flag of Greater London in the United Kingdom
the Flag of London, Ontario in Canada